The Strait of Gibraltar crossing is a hypothetical bridge or tunnel spanning the Strait of Gibraltar (about 14 km or 9 miles at its narrowest point) that would connect Europe and Africa. The governments of Spain and Morocco appointed a joint committee to investigate the feasibility of linking the two continents in 1979, which resulted in the much broader Euromed Transport project.

In January 2021, it was reported that the United Kingdom and Morocco would discuss building the crossing between Gibraltar and Tangiers.

Bridge
Several engineers have designed bridges on various alignments and with differing structural configurations. A 2004 proposal by architect Eugene Tsui was for a floating and submerged bridge connected at a three-mile wide island in the middle of the Mediterranean Sea.

Tunnel

Various tunnels have been proposed. Spain first proposed a modern tunnel under the Strait of Gibraltar in 1930. A major problem arose when the engineers hired by the Spanish government discovered that the material under the Strait was extremely hard rock, making tunnelling impossible with the available technology. One engineering solution was to fix, using cables, a prefabricated concrete tunnel to the floor of the Strait. This tunnel would handle automotive and train traffic.

A 2008 geological study cast doubt on the tunnel's feasibility. In March 2009, a contract was issued for a joint system linking the Moroccan  (SNED) with its Spanish counterpart,  (SECEGSA). A three-year study for a railway tunnel was announced in 2003. SNED and SECEGSA commissioned several seabed surveys.

It is proposed that a connection would have to be made to the Spanish high speed railway network, which has a line projected to be built from Cádiz to Málaga via Algeciras.

A report on the feasibility of the tunnel was presented to the EU in 2009. A further project study is under development by a group of specialist consultants from SYSTRA, Amberg and COWI.

Planning

The political origins of the project arise from the Common Hispanic-Moroccan Declaration of Fez, of 16 June 1979, and signed by the kings of Spain and Morocco.

In December 2003, Spain and Morocco agreed to explore the construction of an underwater rail tunnel to connect their rail systems.
In late 2006, Lombardi Engineering Ltd, a Swiss engineering and design company, was retained to draft a design for a railway tunnel. According to the company, the main differences between the construction of this tunnel and that of the Channel Tunnel, linking France and Great Britain, are the depth of the sea and the geological conditions. The area under the Strait is less stable than that under the English Channel. An active major geologic fault, the Azores–Gibraltar Transform Fault, bisects the Strait, and severe earthquakes have occurred in the area. The presence of two deep Quaternary clay channels in the middle of the Strait makes construction complex, causing doubts about the feasibility of the project and proposals for an exploratory tunnel.

No official figures about the cost of the project had been announced by 2007, but previous estimates exceeded €5 billion.

In February 2023, after a high-level bilateral meeting between Spain and Morocco, the Moroccan and Spanish governments resolved to relaunch the project for an undersea railway tunnel under the Strait of Gibraltar. As of 2023, the project is planned to start construction in 2030.

Technical aspects

The construction of terminals, such as the Eurotunnel Folkestone Terminal and Eurotunnel Calais Terminal at either end of the Channel Tunnel, might be required for trans-shipment of road vehicles.

Ferry 
Car ferries have long operated across the Strait of Gibraltar. As of 2023 they operate on these routes:
Algeciras – Tangier
Tarifa – Tangier
Algeciras – Ceuta
The ferry traffic has an established base of customers, useful to calculate an amount of users for a fixed link.

See also
 Atlantropa
 Bridge of the Horns
 Extreme Engineering
 Marmaray
 Morocco–Spain border
 Morocco–Spain relations
 Transport in Morocco
 Transport in Spain
 Intercontinental and transoceanic fixed links
 Floating cable-stayed bridge
 Cable-stayed suspension bridge

References

External links
SNED
SECEGSA
Documentario - Il Ponte sullo stretto di Gibilterra Parte 1 
Documentario - Il Ponte sullo stretto di Gibilterra Parte 2 
Documentario - Il Ponte sullo stretto di Gibilterra Parte 3 

Strait of Gibraltar
Proposed bridges in Europe
Transport in Spain
Transport in Morocco
International tunnels
Railway tunnels in Spain
Proposed transcontinental crossings
Gibraltar Tunnel
Proposed undersea tunnels in Africa
Buildings and structures in Tanger-Tetouan-Al Hoceima
Proposed railway tunnels in Africa
Proposed railway tunnels in Europe
Proposed bridges in Africa
Morocco–Spain border
Morocco–Spain relations